Komil Urunbayev (born 7 September 1976) is a Uzbekistani alpine skier. He competed at the 1998 Winter Olympics and the 2002 Winter Olympics.

References

1976 births
Living people
Uzbekistani male alpine skiers
Olympic alpine skiers of Uzbekistan
Alpine skiers at the 1998 Winter Olympics
Alpine skiers at the 2002 Winter Olympics
Alpine skiers at the 1996 Asian Winter Games
Alpine skiers at the 1999 Asian Winter Games
20th-century Uzbekistani people
21st-century Uzbekistani people